Old Tongue or The Old Tongue may refer to:
 An ancient language
 An extinct language

Arts and entertainment
 Old Tongue (poem), by Jackie Kay
Old Tongues, a 1994 Dutch film
 The fictional languages depicted as so named in these media franchises:
 A Song of Ice and Fireby George R. R. Martin
 The Wheel of Time by Robert Jordan and Brandon Sanderson
 Star Wars by George Lucas

See also
 List of languages by first written accounts
 Tongue (disambiguation)